Artenara is a village and a Spanish municipality in the western part of the island of Gran Canaria in the Las Palmas province in the Canary Islands.

Artenara is the smallest municipality of Gran Canaria in population.

Population

See also
List of municipalities in Las Palmas

References

External links
Artenara tourism

Municipalities in Gran Canaria